The Storage is a 2011 Finnish comedy film directed by Taru Mäkelä.

Cast
 Kari-Pekka Toivonen as Antero Rousku
 Minttu Mustakallio as Karita
 Aku Hirviniemi as Raninen
 Esko Salminen as Kataja
 Juha Muje as Store manager
 Tomi Lauri as Rofa
 Vesa Vierikko as Jylhäkorpi
 Hannele Lauri as Aino
 Vesa-Matti Loiri as Mynttinen
 Jope Ruonansuu as Ykä

References

External links
 

2011 films
2011 comedy films
Finnish comedy films
2010s Finnish-language films
Films directed by Taru Mäkelä
Films based on Finnish novels